Nicholas: A Manhattan Christmas Story is a children's fantasy novel by Anne Carroll Moore, first published in 1924. The story follows eight-inch-tall Nicholas from Holland on a tour of the sights of New York and recounts his encounters with many famous people, fictional characters, and magical beings. It includes many references to the children's literature of the time. The novel, illustrated by Jay Van Everen, was a Newbery Honor recipient in 1925.

References

1924 American novels
Children's fantasy novels
Christmas children's books
American children's novels
Newbery Honor-winning works
Novels set in New York City
1924 children's books